General elections were held in Zanzibar on 25 October 2015 alongside the 2015 Tanzanian general elections. Incumbent president of Zanzibar Ali Mohamed Shein was running for his second term against Zanzibar First Vice President Seif Sharif Hamad.

Following the vote, the Zanzibar election commission annulled the elections citing irregularities and a rerun was held on 20 March 2016.

Candidates

Presidential Election 
There were 14 candidates that qualified to run for the presidential election in 2016.

House of Representatives Election 
There were 180 candidates from various parties fighting for 54 electable seats in the Zanzibar House of Representatives.

Results 
The votes of the elections were annulled by the Zanzibar Election Commission, citing irregularities in the process and put forward a recommendation for a re-run that was held in 2016. However, only local Zanzibar election results were annulled, the annulment, did not affect the overall outcome of the national presidential elections, meaning that the same ballots that were disqualified for the Zanzibari election were still included in the national count.

Reactions

Domestic 

 Various large opposition members mainly of the political alliance called Ukawa denounced the decision by the Election commission to annul the election, citing it was done to steal the election in favour of CCM.

International 

  United States: The US Embassy in Dar es Salaam said that they were “gravely alarmed” by the annulment and requested the decision be overturned.
 : A joint statement by the Heads of Election Observer Missions in Tanzania that included members from the Commonwealth of Nations, African Union, Southern African Development Community expressed concern in the decision by the election commission of Zanzibar and requested the show increased transparency in their decision to annul the elections.

References 

2015 elections in Tanzania
2015
October 2015 events in Africa
2015